Theodore Wilhelm (1909–1971) was a German actor.

Filmography

References

External links

1909 births
1971 deaths
German male film actors
German male television actors
20th-century German male actors